The 1980–81 NBA season was the fifth season in the NBA, the seventh in San Antonio and the 13th as a franchise. It was a landmark season in many ways. The San Antonio Spurs moved to the Western Conference along with the Houston Rockets. The Spurs won their first Midwest Division title, and their third division title overall (they had won the Central Division in 1977-78 and 1978–79). The Spurs had the fourth best team offensive rating in the NBA.

Draft picks

Roster

Regular season
Under realignment, the Spurs were shifted to the Midwest Division in the Western Conference. Looking to improve on the previous season, the Spurs looked to shore up the defense by acquiring Dave Corzine, Dave Johnson, and Reggie Johnson. The moves paid immediate dividends as the Spurs got off to a 10-2 start, on the way to a Division Crown with a 52-30 record. In the playoffs, the Spurs lost in 7 games to the cross-state rival Houston Rockets.

 The 1980-81 San Antonio Spurs scored 9209 points and allowed 8973 points
 The Spurs Points Per 100 Possessions on Offense was 109.7, which ranked 1st out of 23 teams. Their Points Per 100 Possessions on the Defense was 104.5, ranking them 8th out of 23.

Season standings

Notes
z, y – division champions
x – clinched playoff spot

Record vs. opponents

Game log

Regular season

|- align="center" bgcolor="#ccffcc"
| 1
| October 10
| @ Denver
| W 113–112
|
|
|
| McNichols Sports Arena
| 1–0
|- align="center" bgcolor="#ffcccc"
| 2
| October 11
| @ Dallas
| L 92–103
|
|
|
| Reunion Arena
| 1–1
|- align="center" bgcolor="#ccffcc"
| 3
| October 14
| Kansas City
| W 109–103
|
|
|
| HemisFair Arena
| 2–1
|- align="center" bgcolor="#ccffcc"
| 4
| October 16
| @ Detroit
| W 102–99
|
|
|
| Pontiac Silverdome
| 3–1
|- align="center" bgcolor="#ccffcc"
| 5
| October 18
| Dallas
| W 110–96
|
|
|
| HemisFair Arena
| 4–1
|- align="center" bgcolor="#ccffcc"
| 6
| October 21
| San Diego
| W 123–120
|
|
|
| HemisFair Arena
| 5–1
|- align="center" bgcolor="#ccffcc"
| 7
| October 23
| Golden State
| W 128–109
|
|
|
| HemisFair Arena
| 6–1
|- align="center" bgcolor="#ccffcc"
| 8
| October 25
| @ San Diego
| W 116–98
|
|
|
| San Diego Sports Arena
| 7–1
|- align="center" bgcolor="#ccffcc"
| 9
| October 26
| @ Los Angeles
| W 108–102
|
|
|
| The Forum
| 8–1
|- align="center" bgcolor="#ccffcc"
| 10
| October 28
| Portland
| W 120–112
|
|
|
| HemisFair Arena
| 9–1
|- align="center" bgcolor="#ffcccc"
| 11
| October 29
| @ Utah
| L 96–109
|
|
|
| Salt Palace Acord Arena
| 9–2
|- align="center" bgcolor="#ccffcc"
| 12
| October 31
| @ Seattle
| W 112–96
|
|
|
| Kingdome
| 10–2

|- align="center" bgcolor="#ffcccc"
| 13
| November 1
| @ Golden State
| L 108–123
|
|
|
| Oakland–Alameda County Coliseum Arena
| 10–3
|- align="center" bgcolor="#ccffcc"
| 14
| November 5
| Phoenix
| W 114–84
|
|
|
| HemisFair Arena
| 11–3
|- align="center" bgcolor="#ccffcc"
| 15
| November 8
| Los Angeles
| W 112–109
|
|
|
| HemisFair Arena
| 12–3
|- align="center" bgcolor="#ffcccc"
| 16
| November 11
| Indiana
| L 113–119
|
|
|
| HemisFair Arena
| 12–4
|- align="center" bgcolor="#ffcccc"
| 17
| November 12
| @ Phoenix
| L 127–130
|
|
|
| Arizona Veterans Memorial Coliseum
| 12–5
|- align="center" bgcolor="#ccffcc"
| 18
| November 13
| @ San Diego
| W 113–107
|
|
|
| San Diego Sports Arena
| 13–5
|- align="center" bgcolor="#ccffcc"
| 19
| November 15
| Utah
| W 120–104
|
|
|
| HemisFair Arena
| 14–5
|- align="center" bgcolor="#ffcccc"
| 20
| November 18
| @ Atlanta
| L 93–97
|
|
|
| The Omni
| 14–6
|- align="center" bgcolor="#ccffcc"
| 21
| November 19
| @ New Jersey
| W 112–104 (OT)
|
|
|
| Rutgers Athletic Center
| 15–6
|- align="center" bgcolor="#ffcccc"
| 22
| November 22
| Philadelphia
| L 101–108
|
|
|
| HemisFair Arena
| 15–7
|- align="center" bgcolor="#ccffcc"
| 23
| November 26
| Chicago
| W 125–122
|
|
|
| HemisFair Arena
| 16–7
|- align="center" bgcolor="#ffcccc"
| 24
| November 28
| Houston
| L 115–124
|
|
|
| HemisFair Arena
| 16–8
|- align="center" bgcolor="#ccffcc"
| 25
| November 29
| @ Kansas City
| W 106–104
|
|
|
| Kemper Arena
| 17–8

|- align="center" bgcolor="#ffcccc"
| 26
| December 2
| Phoenix
| L 107–122
|
|
|
| HemisFair Arena
| 17–9
|- align="center" bgcolor="#ccffcc"
| 27
| December 4
| Cleveland
| W 130–100
|
|
|
| HemisFair Arena
| 18–9
|- align="center" bgcolor="#ffcccc"
| 28
| December 7
| @ Portland
| L 115–116
|
|
|
| Memorial Coliseum
| 18–10
|- align="center" bgcolor="#ffcccc"
| 29
| December 8
| @ Seattle
| L 99–104
|
|
|
| Kingdome
| 18–11
|- align="center" bgcolor="#ccffcc"
| 30
| December 9
| @ Utah
| W 115–90
|
|
|
| Salt Palace Acord Arena
| 19–11
|- align="center" bgcolor="#ccffcc"
| 31
| December 11
| Kansas City
| W 122–104
|
|
|
| HemisFair Arena
| 20–11
|- align="center" bgcolor="#ccffcc"
| 32
| December 13
| Denver
| W 147–123
|
|
|
| HemisFair Arena
| 21–11
|- align="center" bgcolor="#ffcccc"
| 33
| December 14
| @ Milwaukee
| L 98–115
|
|
|
| MECCA Arena
| 21–12
|- align="center" bgcolor="#ccffcc"
| 34
| December 16
| @ Dallas
| W 89–83
|
|
|
| Reunion Arena
| 22–12
|- align="center" bgcolor="#ccffcc"
| 35
| December 17
| @ Houston
| W 113–107
|
|
|
| The Summit
| 23–12
|- align="center" bgcolor="#ccffcc"
| 36
| December 19
| Golden State
| W 126–111
|
|
|
| HemisFair Arena
| 24–12
|- align="center" bgcolor="#ffcccc"
| 37
| December 21
| @ Los Angeles
| L 122–135
|
|
|
| The Forum
| 24–13
|- align="center" bgcolor="#ffcccc"
| 38
| December 25
| @ Phoenix
| L 111–131
|
|
|
| Arizona Veterans Memorial Coliseum
| 24–14
|- align="center" bgcolor="#ccffcc"
| 39
| December 27
| Utah
| W 142–117
|
|
|
| HemisFair Arena
| 25–14
|- align="center" bgcolor="#ccffcc"
| 40
| December 30
| Seattle
| W 102–100
|
|
|
| HemisFair Arena
| 26–14

|- align="center" bgcolor="#ccffcc"
| 41
| January 2
| Los Angeles
| W 118–112
|
|
|
| HemisFair Arena
| 27–14
|- align="center" bgcolor="#ccffcc"
| 42
| January 3
| @ Chicago
| W 119–111
|
|
|
| Chicago Stadium
| 28–14
|- align="center" bgcolor="#ccffcc"
| 43
| January 6
| @ New York
| W 113–108
|
|
|
| Madison Square Garden
| 29–14
|- align="center" bgcolor="#ffcccc"
| 44
| January 7
| @ Philadelphia
| L 102–135
|
|
|
| The Spectrum
| 29–15
|- align="center" bgcolor="#ccffcc"
| 45
| January 9
| Portland
| W 102–86
|
|
|
| HemisFair Arena
| 30–15
|- align="center" bgcolor="#ccffcc"
| 46
| January 11
| Washington
| W 137–106
|
|
|
| HemisFair Arena
| 31–15
|- align="center" bgcolor="#ccffcc"
| 47
| January 14
| New York
| W 116–105
|
|
|
| HemisFair Arena
| 32–15
|- align="center" bgcolor="#ffcccc"
| 48
| January 16
| @ Boston
| L 85–94
|
|
|
| Boston Garden
| 32–16
|- align="center" bgcolor="#ffcccc"
| 49
| January 17
| @ Washington
| L 93–103
|
|
|
| Capital Centre
| 32–17
|- align="center" bgcolor="#ccffcc"
| 50
| January 20
| Phoenix
| W 119–112 (OT)
|
|
|
| HemisFair Arena
| 33–17
|- align="center" bgcolor="#ffcccc"
| 51
| January 21
| @ Kansas City
| L 108–115
|
|
|
| Kemper Arena
| 33–18
|- align="center" bgcolor="#ffcccc"
| 52
| January 24
| @ Denver
| L 115–129
|
|
|
| McNichols Sports Arena
| 33–19
|- align="center" bgcolor="#ffcccc"
| 53
| January 25
| @ Portland
| L 100–118
|
|
|
| Memorial Coliseum
| 33–20
|- align="center" bgcolor="#ccffcc"
| 54
| January 29
| New Jersey
| W 122–108
|
|
|
| HemisFair Arena
| 34–20

|- align="center" bgcolor="#ccffcc"
| 55
| February 3
| Detroit
| W 102–99
|
|
|
| HemisFair Arena
| 35–20
|- align="center" bgcolor="#ccffcc"
| 56
| February 4
| @ Denver
| W 135–132
|
|
|
| McNichols Sports Arena
| 36–20
|- align="center" bgcolor="#ccffcc"
| 57
| February 6
| Portland
| W 122–96
|
|
|
| HemisFair Arena
| 37–20
|- align="center" bgcolor="#ccffcc"
| 58
| February 8
| Dallas
| W 102–98
|
|
|
| HemisFair Arena
| 38–20
|- align="center" bgcolor="#ffcccc"
| 59
| February 11
| @ Houston
| L 89–108
|
|
|
| The Summit
| 38–21
|- align="center" bgcolor="#ccffcc"
| 60
| February 12
| Atlanta
| W 110–109
|
|
|
| HemisFair Arena
| 39–21
|- align="center" bgcolor="#ccffcc"
| 61
| February 14
| @ Dallas
| W 107–99
|
|
|
| Reunion Arena
| 40–21
|- align="center" bgcolor="#ccffcc"
| 62
| February 15
| Milwaukee
| W 110–108
|
|
|
| HemisFair Arena
| 41–21
|- align="center" bgcolor="#ffcccc"
| 63
| February 17
| Boston
| L 116–128
|
|
|
| HemisFair Arena
| 41–22
|- align="center" bgcolor="#ffcccc"
| 64
| February 19
| @ Cleveland
| L 104–118
|
|
|
| Richfield Coliseum
| 41–23
|- align="center" bgcolor="#ffcccc"
| 65
| February 20
| @ Indiana
| L 106–109
|
|
|
| Market Square Arena
| 41–24
|- align="center" bgcolor="#ccffcc"
| 66
| February 22
| Denver
| W 133–129 (OT)
|
|
|
| HemisFair Arena
| 42–24
|- align="center" bgcolor="#ccffcc"
| 67
| February 24
| Golden State
| W 131–126
|
|
|
| HemisFair Arena
| 43–24
|- align="center" bgcolor="#ccffcc"
| 68
| February 26
| Seattle
| W 123–113
|
|
|
| HemisFair Arena
| 44–24

|- align="center" bgcolor="#ccffcc"
| 69
| March 1
| Houston
| W 102–86
|
|
|
| HemisFair Arena
| 45–24
|- align="center" bgcolor="#ffcccc"
| 70
| March 4
| Kansas City
| L 97–111
|
|
|
| HemisFair Arena
| 45–25
|- align="center" bgcolor="#ffcccc"
| 71
| March 6
| @ Seattle
| L 94–102
|
|
|
| Kingdome
| 45–26
|- align="center" bgcolor="#ccffcc"
| 72
| March 8
| Dallas
| W 133–108
|
|
|
| HemisFair Arena
| 46–26
|- align="center" bgcolor="#ffcccc"
| 73
| March 10
| @ Los Angeles
| L 104–118
|
|
|
| The Forum
| 46–27
|- align="center" bgcolor="#ffcccc"
| 74
| March 14
| @ San Diego
| L 118–126
|
|
|
| San Diego Sports Arena
| 46–28
|- align="center" bgcolor="#ccffcc"
| 75
| March 15
| @ Golden State
| W 114–112 (OT)
|
|
|
| Oakland–Alameda County Coliseum Arena
| 47–28
|- align="center" bgcolor="#ccffcc"
| 76
| March 17
| Utah
| W 94–86
|
|
|
| HemisFair Arena
| 48–28
|- align="center" bgcolor="#ccffcc"
| 77
| March 20
| @ Kansas City
| W 114–111 (OT)
|
|
|
| Kemper Arena
| 49–28
|- align="center" bgcolor="#ccffcc"
| 78
| March 22
| San Diego
| W 107–99
|
|
|
| HemisFair Arena
| 50–28
|- align="center" bgcolor="#ffcccc"
| 79
| March 24
| Denver
| L 123–125
|
|
|
| HemisFair Arena
| 50–29
|- align="center" bgcolor="#ffcccc"
| 80
| March 25
| @ Houston
| L 111–117
|
|
|
| The Summit
| 50–30
|- align="center" bgcolor="#ccffcc"
| 81
| March 26
| @ Utah
| W 98–97
|
|
|
| Salt Palace Acord Arena
| 51–30
|- align="center" bgcolor="#ccffcc"
| 82
| March 29
| Houston
| W 135–109
|
|
|
| HemisFair Arena
| 52–30

Playoffs

|- align="center" bgcolor="#ffcccc"
| 1
| April 7
| Houston
| L 98–107
| George Gervin (30)
| George Johnson (12)
| Paul Griffin (7)
| HemisFair Arena13,319
| 0–1
|- align="center" bgcolor="#ccffcc"
| 2
| April 8
| Houston
| W 125–113
| Mark Olberding (34)
| G. Johnson, Griffin (7)
| Dave Corzine (7)
| HemisFair Arena12,128
| 1–1
|- align="center" bgcolor="#ffcccc"
| 3
| April 10
| @ Houston
| L 99–112
| George Gervin (33)
| Gervin, G. Johnson (8)
| Mark Olberding (5)
| The Summit16,121
| 1–2
|- align="center" bgcolor="#ccffcc"
| 4
| April 12
| @ Houston
| W 114–112
| George Gervin (33)
| Dave Corzine (11)
| Mark Olberding (6)
| The Summit16,121
| 2–2
|- align="center" bgcolor="#ffcccc"
| 5
| April 14
| Houston
| L 117–123
| Reggie Johnson (25)
| George Johnson (11)
| George Gervin (9)
| HemisFair Arena16,114
| 2–3
|- align="center" bgcolor="#ccffcc"
| 6
| April 15
| @ Houston
| W 101–96
| George Gervin (26)
| three players tied (8)
| Mark Olberding (6)
| The Summit16,121
| 3–3
|- align="center" bgcolor="#ffcccc"
| 7
| April 17
| Houston
| L 100–105
| George Gervin (21)
| George Johnson (10)
| Johnny Moore (10)
| HemisFair Arena16,114
| 3–4
|-

Player stats
Note: GP= Games played; FG= Field Goals; FT= Free Throws; REB= Rebounds; AST= Assists; STL = Steals; BLK = Blocks; PTS = Points; AVG = Average

Award winners
 George Gervin, All-NBA First Team
 George Johnson, NBA Leader Blocks per Game, 3.4

Transactions

References

 San Antonio Spurs on Database Basketball
 San Antonio Spurs on Basketball Reference

San Antonio Spurs seasons
San Antonio Spurs
San Antonio Spurs
San Antonio Spurs